Upstarts is an Indian comedy-drama film directed by Udai Singh Pawar and Produced by Janani Ravichandran and Jawahar Sharma. The film stars Priyanshu Painyuli, Chandrachoor Rai and Shadab Kamal in the lead roles and follows the story of three college graduates who create a startup and the events that follow. It was released on 18 October, 2019 on Netflix. Upstart was announced by Netflix among the nine films to be made by them. Raja Krishna Menon served as the creative producer.

Cast 
Priyanshu Painyuli as Kapil
Chandrachoor Rai as Yash
Shadab Kamal as Vinay
Sheetal Thakur as Jaya
Mrinal Dutt as Ajay Bansal
Rajeev Siddhartha
Ivan Rodrigues as Investor 3
Ninad Kamat
Swati Semwal
Eijaz Khan

References

External links 
 

2010s Hindi-language films
2019 comedy-drama films
2019 direct-to-video films
2019 films
Films about businesspeople
Hindi-language Netflix original films
Indian direct-to-video films